P. Chikkamuni Mohan (born 24 July 1963) is an Indian politician and member of the 17th Lok Sabha from Bangalore Central constituency. He is a member of the Bharatiya Janata Party. He is a Member of the Parliamentary Committees on External Affairs and Urban Development. Member of BJP for more than two decades, he served as the party's Treasurer and President of the state's OBC wing.

An experienced Parliamentarian and grassroots leader, PC Mohan was previously elected twice to the Karnataka Assembly in 1999 and 2004 from Chickpet constituency in Bengaluru, Karnataka.

As a Member of the Standing committee on Urban Development, Mohan played a crucial role and made significant efforts to improve Bengaluru's infrastructure and transportation issues including the expansion of Metro rail in Bengaluru.

Political career

P.C. Mohan was a member of the Karnataka Legislative Assembly from Chickpet constituency from 1999 to 2008. Out of 37 candidates in 2009, he won the 15th Lok Sabha elections with 340,162 votes against H.T. Sangliana of the INC who received 304,944 votes.

P.C. Mohan represents Bangalore Central constituency at the Parliament.

Lok Sabha elections

2014 
Mohan held the seat (he previously won in 2009) with 557,130 votes, a margin of 137,500 over his nearest rival, Rizwan Arshad of the Indian National Congress, who received 419,630 votes.

References

 

1963 births
Bharatiya Janata Party politicians from Karnataka
India MPs 2009–2014
Politicians from Bangalore
Living people
Lok Sabha members from Karnataka
India MPs 2014–2019
Karnataka MLAs 2004–2007
India MPs 2019–present